The Stadium Bowl (originally Tacoma Stadium) is a 15,000-seat stadium in the Stadium District of Tacoma, Washington, United States. It is adjacent to Stadium High School with views of Commencement Bay and Puget Sound from its open north end. The stadium was designed by Frederick Heath and opened in 1910, primarily for use by the then-renamed Stadium High School and later Silas High School.

The Stadium Bowl is designed for American football as well as track and field events. It has also hosted baseball and other sports in the past. The stadium originally seated 23,000, but was later reduced in capacity during renovations and restoration projects.

History

The stadium was proposed in 1906 at the site of Old Woman's Gulch and designed by Frederick Heath. It was originally built with a seating capacity of 23,486 and a total capacity of 32,000 that was later reduced to 17,000. The stadium is on an asymmetrical block bounded by North E Street (south); Tacoma High School and North 1st Street (east); North 3rd Street and North Stadium Way (originally Cliff Avenue) (west); and North Schuster Parkway, railroad tracks and Commencement Bay (north).

Wooden molds were built to cast concrete for 31 rows of stadium seating (able to hold 11,000 spectators) surrounding the playfield. It was dedicated on June 10, 1910, and was originally named Tacoma Stadium. It cost $135,000 to construct (equivalent to $ in  dollars). One of its first major events held at the new stadium was a military tournament in late July with 32,000 spectators on the final night.

Floodlights were temporarily installed for a 1929 football game, the first to be played at night in the Pacific Northwest. It was home to several minor league sports teams and hosted football and baseball exhibitions for college and professional teams. The stadium was flooded and buried by a mudslide in 1932 and closed until 1935. It later suffered major damaged in the April 1949 and April 1965 earthquakes that shook the Puget Sound region. The Stadium Bowl was condemned due to unsafe conditions, namely the cracked concrete, in 1949 but was later reopened in 1961 following the rebuilding of seated areas at a cost of $60,000.

Demolition of the original seating structure, which had deteriorated further and only had 6,000 usable seats, began in December 1977 ahead of a planned renovation project. The Tacoma School District received a $2 million federal grant for the renovation and initially approved a "no-frills" design with 15,000 seats and no floodlights; a state grant allowed for the floodlights to be re-added to the design plan, which also included locker rooms under the stands. The 15,000-seat stadium reopened on August 23, 1980, with a two-day arts fair, soapbox derby, and re-dedication ceremony.

In October 1981, a burst storm drain washed away the scoreboard and the north end zone of the football field. The stadium reopened on October 23, 1985, following the installation of a new artificial turf surface and track that cost $725,000. The Tacoma Express, a semi-professional American football team playing in the Minor League Football System, moved to the Stadium Bowl for the 1990 season after being unable to afford to stay at the Tacoma Dome. The team was folded by the league in September 1990 after playing without an owner for several weeks.

On October 10, 2015, Stadium bowl experienced a mass flooding due to improper drain management. Videos of the bowl flooding quickly went viral. The videos of the bowl flooding were so captivating that they were even featured on CNN. Despite having multiple drains in the streets above the stadium, the drains became too overwhelmed with water, causing the flooding. The water eroded soil under the stadium's main stairwell, soaked the field-turf with water, mud, and debris, flooded the locker rooms used by home and away teams, and also caused a small trench to form on the Northern side of the stadium. The flooding would cause all subsequent sporting events at the stadium to be postponed, canceled, or relocated to nearby fields or schools. Officials decided to keep the stadium closed until early 2016, and football games would not return until the following September.

Notable events
Stadium Bowl has hosted many memorable sporting events, concerts, and ceremonies including:

 Speeches held by United States Presidents Theodore Roosevelt, Woodrow Wilson, and Warren Harding and United States Secretary of State William Jennings Bryan
 Ceremonies and battle reenactments for military figures such as John Pershing and Marshal Foch
 Baseball exhibitions for players such as Babe Ruth and Billy Sunday
 The Washington State Cougars of Pullman played a football game against team from Camp Lewis at the stadium in 1917
 The Cougars also played Texas A&M in December 1941
 Washington State hosted Penn State on Thanksgiving weekend in 1948
 Gasoline powered model airplane meetup in 1947

Appearances in media 
Stadium bowl and the connected high school are well known for its unique and captivating design. This has led the bowl to make appearances in film, and is often highly ranked in lists that showcase high schools with the best architecture.

Most notably, Stadium high school was used as a filming location in the 1999 cult classic film, 10 Things I Hate About You. Renamed "Padua High School" in the movie, many scenes were filmed at the school. One of the most memorable scenes in the movie involves Heath Ledger's character serenading Julia Stiles' character while she is at soccer practice in the Stadium Bowl. While singing Frankie Valli's "Can't Take My Eyes Off You", Ledger would run up and down the iconic stairs of the Bowl, making for one of the most memorable in the film.

Stadium Bowl was chosen in 2008 as one of the best high school football stadiums in the U.S. by ESPN.

Stadium Bowl was listed on MaxPreps as one of "10 high school football stadiums to see before you die".

Sports Illustrated also listed Stadium as one of the 13 must see high school football stadiums in the United States.

References

External links
 Venue information
 South Sound Talk - Stadium High School History Soars in Tacoma

High school football venues in the United States
Sports venues in Tacoma, Washington
Frederick Heath buildings
1910 establishments in Washington (state)
Sports venues completed in 1910